Kerguelenella lateralis is a species of air-breathing sea snail or false limpet, a marine pulmonate gastropod mollusc in the family Siphonariidae, the false limpets.

Description
The shell size varies between 10 mm and  20 mm

Distribution
This species is distributed in the cold waters at the southern tip of South America and along South Georgia and along the southern tip of New Zealand

References

 Powell A. W. B., New Zealand Mollusca, William Collins Publishers Ltd, Auckland, New Zealand 1979

External links
 

Siphonariidae
Gastropods described in 1846
Taxa named by Augustus Addison Gould